Little Hatfield is a small hamlet in the East Riding of Yorkshire, England, in an area known as Holderness.

In 1823 Little Hatfield was in the civil parish of Sigglesthorne, and in the Wapentake and Liberty of Holderness. Population at the time was 25, which included a farmer.

The village was a civil parish until 1935, when it was merged with Goxhill and Great Hatfield to form the parish of Hatfield.

Little Hatfield was served from 1864 to 1964 by Sigglesthorne railway station on the Hull and Hornsea Railway.

References

External links

Villages in the East Riding of Yorkshire
Holderness